The 2015 SARU Community Cup (known as the 2015 Cell C Community Cup for sponsorship reasons) will be the third season of the SARU Community Cup competition. The qualification to the tournament will take place in 2014, while the competition proper will be contested in 2015. The tournament is the top competition for non-university rugby union clubs in South Africa.

Competition

Qualification format

Qualification to the Community Cup will be determined via the club leagues of the fourteen provincial unions, plus Blue Bulls Limpopo. All university and other tertiary institutions are ineligible to participate in the Community Cup.

The highest-placed eligible team in each of the fifteen leagues will automatically qualify to the Community Cup (league rules determined if this is after the league stages or after the title-play-offs). As holders, Rustenburg Impala are guaranteed qualification to the Community Cup. In addition, post-season play-offs will be held between runners-up in the provincial leagues to take the number of participants up to twenty.

Finals format

The format of the Community Cup is the same as the Rugby World Cup. The teams will be divided into four pools, each containing five teams. They will then play four pool games, playing other teams in their respective pools once. Each team will play two home games and two away games.

The winner and runner-up of each pool will enter the play-off stage, to be held at a central venue over the Easter long weekend each year. The play-offs will consist of quarter finals, semi-finals and the final. The winner of each pool will meet the runner-up of a different pool in a quarter final. The winner of each quarter-final will go on to the semi-finals and the semi-final winners to the final, to be held at a neutral venue.

The losing semi-finalists will play each other in the Plate final. The losing quarter finalists will meet in the Bowl semi-final, the winners of which will play in the Bowl final, the losers playing in the Shield final.

Qualification

The highest-placed non-university clubs in the 2014 season of each of the fourteen provincial unions' club leagues, as well as defending champions Rustenburg Impala and play-off winners will all qualify to the 2015 SARU Community Cup competition.

Blue Bulls

The log leader after the pool stage Second Round will qualify to the 2015 SARU Community Cup.

Blue Bulls Limpopo

The play-off final winner will qualify to the 2015 SARU Community Cup.

Boet Fick League

Semi-final

Final

Waterberg League

Semi-final

Final

Play-off

Boland

The log leader after the pool stage will qualify to the 2015 SARU Community Cup.

Border

The play-off final winner will qualify to the 2015 SARU Community Cup.

Eastern Province

The log leader after the pool stage will qualify to the 2015 SARU Community Cup.

Free State

The log leader after the pool stage will qualify to the 2015 SARU Community Cup.

Town Challenge Cup

The Town Challenge Cup is the title play-off matches.

Semi-final

Final

Rowan Cup

The Rowan Cup is the play-off for fourth place.

Final

Golden Lions

The log leader after the pool stage will qualify to the 2015 SARU Community Cup.

Griffons

The play-off final winner will qualify to the 2015 SARU Community Cup.

Final

Griquas

The log leader after the pool stage will qualify to the 2015 SARU Community Cup.

KwaZulu-Natal

The log leader after the pool stage will qualify to the 2015 SARU Community Cup.

Leopards

Rustenburg Impala will qualify as the defending champions. Vaal Reefs will take part in the play-offs.

Rustenburg Impala and  participate in the Golden Lions Pirates Grand Challenge, while Vaal Reefs compete in the Valke Peregrine League.

Mpumalanga

The play-off final winner will qualify to the 2015 SARU Community Cup.

Semi-finals

Final

South Western Districts

The play-off final winner will qualify to the 2015 SARU Community Cup.

Semi-finals

Final

Valke

The play-off final winner will qualify to the 2015 SARU Community Cup.

Western Province

The log leader after the pool stage qualified to the 2015 SARU Community Cup.

Play-offs

The runners-up in the provincial leagues would qualify to the play-offs, with the four Round Three winners also qualifying to the SARU Community Cup, as well as the winner of the repechage.

Round one

 Sasol progressed after Potgietersrus withdrew.

Round two

 College Rovers progressed after Kroonstad withdrew.

Round three

 The Round Three winners – College Rovers, Port Elizabeth Police, Wanderers and Wesbank – qualified for the 2015 SARU Community Cup.
 The Round Three losers – Durbanville-Bellville, Mossel Bay Barbarians, Sasol and Upington Dorp – qualified to the Repechage Semi-finals.

Repechage Semi-finals

 Durbanville-Bellville progressed after Mossel Bay Barbarians withdrew.

Repechage Final

Teams

The following teams qualified for the 2015 SARU Community Cup:

Team listing

Pool Stages

The 20 teams were drawn in the following four pools:

Pool A

Log

Fixtures and results

Round one

Round two

Round three

Round four

Round five

Pool B

Log

Fixtures and results

Round one

Round two

Round three

Round four

Round five

Pool C

Log

Fixtures and results

Round one

Round two

Round three

Round four

Round five

Pool D

Log

Fixtures and results

Round one

Round two

Round three

Round four

Round five

Play-offs

The play-offs will be played at the home of the 2014 champions, Rustenburg Impala, from 2 to 6 April 2015. This will be the first time that the play-offs will be hosted in Rustenburg, with the previous two play-offs in 2013 and 2014 held in George.

Quarter-finals

The winning teams will qualify to the Cup semi-finals, while the losing teams will qualify to the Plate Semi-finals.

Cup semi-finals

The winning teams qualify to the Cup final, while the losing teams qualify to the Cup Third-place play-off.

Plate Semi-finals

The winning teams qualify to the Plate final, while the losing teams qualify to the Plate Third-place play-off.

Cup final

Cup Third-place play-off

Plate final

Plate Third-place play-off

Honours

Players

Squad lists

The teams released the following squad lists:

Bloemfontein Crusaders

Forwards

 Donavan Ball
 Moekoa Bolofo
 Zane Botha
 Daniel Caku-Caku
 Max Chabane
 Joseph Dweba
 Lebogang Gabole
 Joachim Hoffman
 Duane Krull
 Don Manus
 Gustav Muller
 Randall Nelson
 Leon Strydom
 Lebohang Tsoeu
 Johnny van der Merwe
 Johannes van Niekerk
 Did not play:
 Mangaliso Matakane
 Gavin Pitt
 Wayven Smith
Backs

 Algernon Andries
 Darren Baron
 Alvin Brandt
 Enver Brandt
 Brandon Colby
 Griffin Colby
 Jason Horne
 Chadwill Jegels
 Isak Job
 Patric Mbangi
 Morné Morolong
 Sherwin Slater
 Michael Smit
 Blaine Tlhapane
 Frans van der Merwe
 Bjorn van Wyk
 Did not play:
 Perry Appies
 Darren Colby
 Bennie Gouws
 Phumzile Mafika
 Luyanda Tole
tbc

 Lucky Joseph Beetha
 Morné Schaffers
 Wayne Armand Slabbert
Coach

 Eddie Fredericks

College Rovers

Forwards

 Paul Bester
 Nikolai Blignaut
 Chesney Botha
 Simba Bwanya
 Jarrett Crouch
 Roan Dalzell
 Christiaan de Bruin
 Wade Elliot
 Senna Esterhuizen
 Graham Geldenhuys
 André Greyvenstein
 Cameron Holenstein
 Matt Jones
 Chris Kemp
 TC Khoza
 Witness Mandizha
 Njabulo Mkize
 Royal Mwale
 Sangoni Mxoli
 Luciando Santos
 Thabo Tshabalala
 Johan Wagenaar
 Did not play:
 Kelvin Adam
 Nico Bezuidenhout
 Chris Cloete
 Duan Coertzen
 Jonno Deighton
 Sbusiso Dube
 Louis Hazelhurst
 Mathew Jackson
 Joseph Oscar Jones
 Jason Kankowski
 Fudge Mabeta
 Sphephelo Mayaba
 Mesuli Mncwango
 Thabo Ngcongo
 Edlyn Serge
 Sanele Sibanda
 Brandon Squires
 Matt Tweddle
 Jason Viviers
Backs

 Keagan Boulle
 Gary Collins
 Quinton Crocker
 Guy Cronjé
 Dumisani Dyonase
 Gareth Jenkinson
 Chris Jordaan
 Kobus Lourens
 Chris Micklewood
 Dusty Noble
 Howard Noble
 Jongi Nokwe
 Riaan O'Neill
 Matt Phillips
 Warren Randall
 Jeandré Small
 Kyle Wilkinson
 Did not play:
 Jake Adam
 Jared Chiocchetti
 Ntuthuko Khumalo
 Gavin Scott
 Anton Verster
tbc

 Chris Anker
 Josh Caruth
 Muzi Israel Dludlu
 Anthony Fivaz
 Juan Pierre Jonck
 Kyle McGarvie
 Lebogang Lawrence Molefe
Coach

 Derek Hieberg

Despatch

Forwards

 Dalton Davis
 Stephan Deyzel
 Bobby Dyer
 Sinjin Greyvenstein
 Elrich Kock
 Dyllan Lamprecht
 Elroy Ligman
 Dumisani Meslane
 Ayanda Nogampula
 Robert Slabbert
 Jaco Swanepoel
 Kobus van der Westhuizen
 Trichardt van Tonder
 Darren van Winkel
 Michael Vermaak
 Ashley Viviers
 Did not play:
 Tashrique Hearne
 Elandré Nel
 Deon Plaatjies
 Jason Strydom
 Morné Strydom
 Armand van Rooyen
Backs

 Ryan Brown
 Selvyn Davids
 Basil de Doncker
 Cameron Jacobs
 Kalvano King
 Morné Labuschagne
 Marlon Lewis
 Lesley Luiters
 Siviwe Magaba
 Baldwin McBean
 Billy Mintoor
 Francois Nel
 Justin Peach
 Wilton Pietersen
 Andile Witbooi
 Did not play:
 Ashwill Adams
 Elandré Basson
 Jaco Bekker
 Deon Booysen
 Aluzant Munnink
 Rosseau Prinsloo
Coach

 Adri Geldenhuys

Durban Collegians

Forwards

 Brandon Backeberg
 Greg Bauer
 Chris Bosch
 Brendon Groenewald
 Robbie Harris
 Stephan Hartman
 Ferdie Horn
 Carl Marks
 Dylan Nel
 Gareth Reece-Edwards
 Joseph Dean Shelley
 Jared Sichel
 Themba Sishi
 Jacques Taylor
 Linda Thwala
 Wian Vosloo
 Did not play:
 Norman Cloete
 Cullen Collopy
 Bruce Curtis
 Adriaan de la Rey
 Michael Downer
 Skholiwe Ndlovu
 Kamogelo Qhu
 Kurt Schonert
 Fanele Zwane
Backs

 Keelin Bastew
 Werner Botha
 Duncan Campbell
 Brendon Cope
 Jacques Fick
 Kyle Hartley
 Andrew Holland
 Dylan Marcus
 Nkululeko Mcuma
 Lindani Ndlela
 Mondli Nkosi
 Calvin Sacks
 Did not play:
 Ethan Beukes
 Handré Bezuidenhout
 Joshua Bragman
 Steve Crause
 Luke Fouché
 Dean Lovett
 Sipho Mkhize
 Justin Newman
 Gerhardus Roets
 Mynhardt van Schalkwyk
 Dougie Warden
tbc

 Byron Johnstone
 Jacques Roux
 Antony Smith
Coach

 Robin Swanepoel

Durbanville-Bellville

Forwards

 Alconray Botha
 Ashton Constant
 Leonard Duvenhage
 Erasmus Jooste
 Rohan Kitshoff
 Karl Liebenberg
 Pieter Loubser
 Renier Marais
 Andrew Picoto
 JP Prinsloo
 Waldo Prinsloo
 Jéan Rossouw
 Richter Rust
 Hano Snyman
 Douw Wessels
 Marius White
 Did not play:
 Beyers Bekker
 Eugene Butterworth
 Roderick Dalton
 Anton Duvenhage
 Jean-Pierre Ellard
 Christoff Janse van Rensburg
 Schalk Jooste
 Juan-Paul Kellerman
 Johann Lambrechts
 Nicolaas Cornelius Nel
 William Scott
 Ruan Snyman
 Morné Strydom
 Petrus van der Merwe
 Craig Walker
Backs

 Brendon April
 Garth April
 Angus Cleophas
 Luhann de Kock
 Danwel Demas
 Janco Gunter
 Marnus Hugo
 Jason Kriel
 Roderick Moses
 Raymond Olivier
 Tiaan Radyn
 Dane Sherratt
 Deon Thiart
 Did not play:
 Raynor Becker
 Léroy Bitterhout
 Francois Botha
 Shane Grundlingh
 Gavin Hauptfleisch
 Eldred James
 Mayibuye Ndwandwa
 Graham O'Leary
 Malan Roode
 Chevandré van Schoor
tbc

 Arthur William John Adonis
 Hermanus Petrus du Plessis
 Cornelis Rademeyer Ferreira
 Steward Ronald Jacobs
 Daniel David Krynauw
 Tiaan Roelofse
 Russell Roux
 Hanekom Gerrit Stoffberg
 Johan André Theron
 Branden Morné Vaarland
 Rouxan Vermeulen
Coach

 Jan Loubser

Evergreens

Forwards

 Eugene Barnard
 Riaan Basson
 Alrico Beukes
 Armand Coetzee
 Dean Hopp
 Chris Kruger
 Gerschwin Muller
 Byron November
 Alistair November
 Marvin November
 Anvor Prins
 Xavier Scholtz
 Isaac Treurnicht
 Llewellyn Treurnicht
 Did not play:
 Ronaldo Francisco Damons
 Gavin Delport
 Lorencois Olkers
 Rosco Snyman
Backs

 Quinton Afrika
 Kerwin Appollis
 Ru-Wahn Bredenkamp
 Joseph Fortuin
 Gideon Lambrechts
 Rudi Michaels
 Leegan Moos
 Mario Noordman
 Grant November
 Deroy Rhoode
 Deon Stoffels
 Luzanne Williams
 Did not play:
 Charl Kitching
 C-Than Justin Moos
 Lee-Roy Pojie
 Marchell Potts
 Chadley Stride
 Divandré Strydom
 Darren Wood
tbc

 Elton October
Coach

 Mirco Geduld

Hamiltons

Forwards

 Jody Burch
 Sandile Buthelezi
 Niel Cleghorn
 Marthinus Coetzee
 Francois Esterhuyzen
 Sebastian Ferreira
 Henk Franken
 Francois Hanekom
 Lutho Kote
 Christo McNish
 Jacques Oosthuizen
 Denzel Riddles
 Gareth Rowe
 Michael Teichmann
 Tapiwa Tsomondo
 Greg van Jaarsveld
 Michael Melt van Niekerk
 Did not play:
 Ross Beckett
 Tian Fick
 Patrick Holman
 Dugald Robertson
 Brand Taljaard
 Abraham Winter
Backs

 Iewan Bartels
 Andrew Coetzee
 Pierre Cronjé
 Jandré du Plessis
 Monty Dumond
 Braam Gerber
 Calvin Kotze
 Richard Lawson
 Earl Lewis
 Morgan Newman
 Craig Pheiffer
 Ryno Rust
 Shane Vallender
 Jano van Zyl
 Did not play:
 Reinold Benade
 Terry Jacobs
 Shane Swart
tbc

 Hendrik Matthys Stefanus Ferreira
 Ryan Richard Douglas Johnson
 Nicholas Pearson
 Daniel Ilmar Pikker
 Jonathan Raphael
Coach

 Anton Moolman

Noordelikes

Forwards

 Bruné Bekker
 Dustin Hoffmann
 Juan Jacobs
 Johannes Christoffel Krog
 CP Louw
 Scheepers Lubbe
 Malope Masemola
 Simthandile Memese
 Shane Mienie
 Chrisjan Muller
 Lufuno Ramoyada
 Thabo Tladi
 Leslie Venton
 Wickus Visser
 Did not play:
 Nico Els
 Tienie Janse van Rensburg
 Webster Mugadi
 Jaco Rabe
 Ricardo Varela
Backs

 Zander Byleveldt
 Danie de Bruyn
 Theyman Jongbloed
 Alwyn Olivier
 Daniel Opperman
 Mynhardt Smith
 Gert van der Merwe
 Sias van Wyk
 Arno Venter
 JP Vermeulen
 Did not play:
 Johan de Beer
 Hans du Plessis
 Jacques Els
 Nick Enslin
 Benetton Freeman
 Zanru Fuchs
 Koning Janse van Rensburg
 Wallies Kubannek
 Pikswart Romijn
 Johannes Lodewikus van Niekerk
tbc

 Henri Leon Jordaan
 Willem Adolf Swanepoel
 Christiaan Lodewyk van Niekerk
Coach

 Pikswart Romijn

Old Selbornians

Forwards

 Duran Alberts
 Roy Bursey
 Billy Dutton
 Armon Fourie
 Craig Gombert
 Craig Green
 Anthonie Gronum
 Akona Makalima
 Richard Osner
 Craig Pedersen
 Dylan Pieterse
 Ryan Pietersen
 Jannie Rossouw
 Shane Spring
 Sinethemba Tyokolwana
 Did not play:
 Juan Bekker
 Delarey du Preez
 Grant Gombert
 Marc Hammond
 Ryan Hammond
 Dale Hobbs
 Xola Mapapu
 Siyabonga Mxunyelwa
 Peter Smith
 Marcel Swanepoel
 Travis Venter
 Neil Wood
Backs

 Bradley Birkholtz
 Lindani Gulwa
 Curtis Kleinhans
 MJ le Marquand
 Leon Mauer
 Yongama Mkaza
 Saneliso Ngoma
 Phiwe Nomlomo
 Foxy Ntleki
 Dale Sabbagh
 Craig Shone
 Bjorn van Zyl
 Paul Warner
 Did not play:
 Michael Amui
 Wade Bailey
 Gareth Catherine
 Eric Coates
 Lunga Dumezweni
 Royden Kennedy
 Sibabalwe Mtsulwana
 James Posthumus
 Warren Rielly
 Jared Stanford
 Dylan Swartz
 Jack van Coller
 Keegan Grant van Schalkwyk
 Glen Warner
tbc

 Luvuyo Madliki
 Luyolo Manentsa
 Cuma Mgijima
 Morné Eric Potgieter
Coach

 David McCallum

Port Elizabeth Police

Forwards

 Divan Barnard
 Wessel Ebersohn
 Ferdi Gerber
 Frans Gerber
 Quinton Haasbroek
 Hannes Huisamen
 Dwayne Kinghorn
 Lyle Lombard
 Francois Nel
 Darren Prins
 Ronald Scheckle
 Jeremy Sebia
 Leon Smith
 Wayne van Heerden
 Cornelius van Vuuren
 Lyle Walters
 Did not play:
 Dewald Barnard
 Raynard Fourie
 Elandré Smit
 Jean-Luke van Zyl
 Tiaan Vermaak
Backs

 Jaco Bernardo
 Eckard Jacobs
 Alwyn Jordaan
 Fabian Juries
 Elton Loxton
 Kevin Plaatjies
 Juan Smit
 Ruan Stander
 Monré van As
 Kyle Verwey
 Daantjie Vosloo
 Did not play:
 Andrew Burkett
 Danie le Roux
 Roger Louis
 Christo Memanie
 Marius Muller
 Petrus Jacobus Pretorius
tbc

 Johan Abraham Dyer
 Arno Ben Kleynhans
 Warren van Eck
 Chris Zeelie
 Dean Zonneveld
Coach

 Zane Bosch

Pretoria Police

Forwards

 Ruan Grobler
 Vince Gwavu
 Imille Keyser
 Hannes Ludik
 Nico Luus
 Dwight Pansegrouw
 Johan Pieterse
 Birtie Powell
 Jerry Sefoko
 Luga van Biljon
 Ian van Deventer
 Boris van Jaarsveld
 Rayno Wasserman
 Did not play:
 Hannes de Koker
 Gerhard du Preez
 Gerald Kruger
 Patrick Mathe
 Rinus Moulder
 Gerrit van Gerve
 Werner van Zweel
Backs

 Rikus de Beer
 Natal de Sousa
 Raynardt Honiball
 Dillon Laubscher
 Daron Liebenberg
 Johannes Motsepe
 Michael Nienaber
 Elvis Noludwe
 Heinrich Rademeyer
 Gaybrin Smith
 Nelis Snyman
 Pieter Strydom
 Hendrik van der Nest
 Strepies van Loo
 Ivan Venter
 Did not play:
 Divan Prinsloo
 Pieter van der Nest
tbc

 Quintis Anton Jansen van Vuuren
 Joachim Petrus Marnewick
 Jama Msongelwa
 Sarel Johannes Pienaar
 Ludwig Schmidt
 Anton Arno Snyman
 Kyle Stanley
Coach

 To be confirmed

Raiders

Forwards

 Henna Bredenkamp
 Gustav de Vos
 Daneel Ellis
 Ashalin Govindasamy
 André Hicks
 Velaphi Khumalo
 Ntsako Mlangheni
 Andile Mrwebi
 Sisonke Mtikitiki
 Gaven Nesindande
 Harold Primo
 Ben Sekgobela
 Sive Shasha
 Chezlin Snyders
 Dewald van Deventer
 Did not play:
 Jade Amod
 Courtney Jameson
 Aphiwe Mahlati
 Isaac Mbalo
 Gibson Mcoco
 Mkhululi Mkhize
 Gideon Muller
 Fidel Nyabusha
Backs

 Marceau Alberts
 Arno Coetzee
 Chris Juries
 Arafaat Kock
 Zunaid Kock
 Lincoln Koopman
 Tshepo Mooki
 Gardener Nechironga
 Chris Nqubuli
 Chanwille October
 Ronald Strydom
 Did not play:
 Lindley Anthony
 Bradley Jardine
 Ashley Miles
 Jama Ntengo
 Bradley Paulsen
 Ra-Iq Ploker
 Mbuyiselo Siqebengu
 Prince Sishi
 Sean Smit
 Dirkie Vlooh
tbc

 Allan Maboe
 Ricardo Elrico Muller
 Jaun van Blerk
Coach

 Fernando Penshaw

Rustenburg Impala

Forwards

 Morné Basson
 Paul Bester
 Johno de Klerk
 Zander de Kock
 Leon du Plessis
 Louis Hollamby
 Hendrik Huyser
 Victor Joubert
 Strand Kruger
 Bruce Muller
 Tiaan Nel
 Flippie Pienaar
 Robbie Rawlins
 Rynardt Steenkamp
 Justin Wheeler
 Gavin Williamson
 Did not play:
 Jacques Gnäde
 Ntokozo Mduduzi Mashele
 Petrus Cornelis Nel
 Henri Scharneck
 Solomzi Sotsaka
Backs

 Jermaine Apollis
 Wilco de Wet
 Mzuvukile Duma
 Cecil Dumond
 Morné Jooste
 Willie Kok
 Nico Kruger
 Stefan Kruger
 Dumisani Matyeshana
 Aubrey McDonald
 Joe Seerane
 Gysbert van Wyk
 Did not play:
 Simphiwe Mtimkulu
 Naas Olivier
 Justin St Jerry
To be confirmed

 Donovan Ricardo Arendse
 André Clarke Engelbrecht
 Johan Lodewyk Engelbrecht
 William James Joshua Finlay
 Dewaldt Jeanré Francois Havenga
 Marnitz Jacobs
 Jean-Pierre le Grange
 Siphiwe Johannes Mdoda
 Nqabisile Mnkani
 Quintin Mostert
 David Schalk Pieterse
 Cornelius Johannes Prinsloo
 Jan-Dirk Slippers
 Reon van der Merwe
Coach

 To be confirmed

Sishen

Forwards

 Anthony de Villiers
 Nico Graaff
 Danie Myburgh
 Leonard Poolman
 Kudu Pretorius
 Cornelius Prinsloo
 André Roberts
 Gummy Roux
 Joubert Steyn
 Nicolaas Steyn
 Renier Strydom
 Pieter van Aarde
 BW van Dyk
 Jamie Zwiegelaar
 Did not play:
 Arnold Coetzee
 Ruan Grobler
 Lyvette Shikwambana
 Herman Wepener
Backs

 Jovan Cookson
 Ryan de Wee
 Adolf du Plessis
 Sarel du Plessis
 Stewart Jacobs
 Tiaan le Roux
 Prince Mofokeng
 Thabang Molefe
 Hendrik Olivier
 Johan Peens
 Aubrené Tities
 Viljoen van der Linde
 Did not play:
 Christo Coetzee
 Brendon Coetzer
 Len le Roux
 Charlton McCarthy
 Stevie Meyer
To be confirmed

 Ulrich Blom
 Jacobus Gideon Johannes Coetzee
 Daryl Dawson
 Pieter Christiaan Voges Lategan
 Zane le Roux
 Wentzel Matthys
 Jakobus Michael Motlhale
 Johannes Nicolaas Peenze
 Jan Rossouw
 Willem Jacobus Schoeman
 Jarques Scholtz
 Bernardus Izak van der Merwe
 Willie Vermeulen
 William Viljoen
 Frederick Hendrik Zeeman
Coach

 Regardt Dreyer

Springs

Forwards

 Steven Boshoff
 Dowayn Botha
 Riaan Botha
 Ockert Brits
 Martiens du Plessis
 Pierre Foord
 Robin Howell
 Calvin Jantjes
 Shaun McGeer
 Garnett Parkin
 Francois Roux
 Chris Smit
 Anton van Deventer
 Did not play:
 Jotham Zakhele Khanye
Backs

 Everard Bye
 Clayton Carl Crause
 Dieter de la Port
 Kazlo Holtzhausen
 Monde Kinana
 Darren Brian Lindsay
 Strachen Nortjé
 Noel Rhodes
 Theo Rhodes
 Corné Uys
 Dawie van Nieuwenhuizen
 Wynand Venter
 Clifford Daniel Viljoen
 Johan Zondagh

To be confirmed

 Gary Arthur Bock
 Wian Engelbrecht
 Tiaan Koekemoer
 Khomotso Maphala Mokwele
 Kgosi Ngwenya
 Altus Stander
 Shawn Swanepoel
 Nicolaas Barend Puren van Wyk
 Marcelle Johnny Viljoen
 Jean Jacques Visser
 Adolf Johannes Vos
Coach

 Kobus van Rooyen

Villagers Worcester

Forwards

 Yrin Belelie
 Timothy John Beukes
 Morné Boshoff
 TC Botha
 Louis Carstens
 Ernst Hendrik Wolfaardt Claassen
 Ashley Peter Godfrey Dreyden
 André du Toit
 Martin Everson
 Jasherie Kariem
 Franklin Daniel Kuhn
 Cliven Malies
 Ansley Mervin Mouton
 Ronwynne Daniel Swanepoel
 Wayne Wilschut
 Did not play:
 Adriaan Botha
 Kenan Cronjé
Backs

 Cheslin Donovan Adams
 Givan Kyle Adams
 Lincolin Ryan Eksteen
 Kirwan Horsemend
 Shandro Issel
 Yazeed Johnson
 Ricardo Jones
 Juhandry Leroy Pieterse
 Nazeem Nilton van Sitters
 Jowayne van Wyk
 David Elton Wehr
 Girchen Wentzel
 Did not play:
 Nazeem de Sousa
To be confirmed

 Francois Daniller
 Eduardo Ashley Fourie
 Hirchel John Grove
 Jaundray Craig Jacobs
 Giovanne Earlan Morkel
 Ayanda Mpayipeli
Coach

 To be confirmed

Wanderers

Forwards

 Rory Anderson
 Shaun Campbell
 Brendon Matthew Cross
 Christo de Jager
 Gareth Fennell
 Anthony Gallacher
 Carl Gliddon
 Gary Mahlangu
 Jonathan Mallett
 Bheki Ndobe
 Stu Prior
 Dylan Rutherford
 Cameron Smith
 Jaques Stierlin
 Geoff Wood
 Nqubeko Zulu
Backs

 Richard Aingworth
 Kyle Dutton
 Wesley Flanagan
 Kewan Gibb
 Peter Owen Hemsley
 Clayton Kelly
 Craig Kolarik
 Azola Mda
 Sifiso Mgaga
 Menzi Sikhulile Ngidi
 Buntu Obose
 Ryan Odendaal
 Darryn Rentzke
 Nicolas van Rooyen
 Did not play:
 Wesley Roberts
To be confirmed

 Dewald Grundeling
 Christopher John Knezovich
 Jason Ray Kyte
 Shawn Lubbe
 Nsovo Shimange
 Nolan Francois van Staden
 Grant Victor
 Gareth Leonard Webster
 Brendan Patrick Whyte
 Sibusiso Samuel Zwane
Coach

 Neil Kalify

Welkom Rovers

Forwards

 Ivan de Klerk
 Marius Engelbrecht
 Johnny Fourie
 Lu-An Kleyngeld
 Gerhard Klopper
 Wayne Ludick
 Thembelani Mabomba
 Brummer Marais
 Donavan Nieuwenhuyzen
 Welile Ntozakhe
 LC van Tonder
 Willem van Staden
 Jean Volkwyn
 Fannie Zim
 Did not play:
 Quintin Davis
Backs

 Hein Bezuidenhout
 Jobrey Fortuin
 Jaco Jooste
 Patrick Kampher
 Shaun Nieuwenhuyzen
 Freddy Siyanda Ntuli
 Jaco Pretorius
 Wessel Pretorius
 Shaun Prins
 Tiaan van Wyk
 Ryno Venter
 Freddie Wepener
 Did not play:
 Robbie Ntlantsana
 Pieter Strydom
To be confirmed

 Steven Johan Breytenbach
 Nathaniel Coetzee
 Juan Davis
 Ruan de Klerk
 Tertius de Villiers
 Casper Asmanus Johannes Heymans
 Zillen Lamprecht
 Dillan Laurent
 Chejana Mallane
 Eon van Zyl
Coach

 Rassie Ras

Wesbank

Forwards

 Aston Claasen
 Nicholas Duhwa
 Gurshwin Dyason
 Emgee Fredericks
 Vincent Fredericks
 Arno Hendriks
 Melvin Laserus
 Petro Louw
 Morris Moses
 Jacquinn Ruthford
 Mario Samson
 Johan September
 Chadley Wenn
 Coenie Westraadt
 Did not play:
 Braison Albertus
 André Coetzee
 Stuart Halvorsen
 Westley Isaacs
 Alwyn Liebenberg
 Andre van Reenen
Backs

 Ronnie Appolis
 Salmon Coetzee
 Anvon Davids
 Sedwell Diedericks
 Brynn Michael Gericke
 Evan Liedeman
 Theodore Marinus
 Johannes Slabber
 Edwill Solomons
 Peter Solomons
 Anzo Stubbs
 Chrislyn van Schalkwyk
 Dashton Wellman
 Did not play:
 Franklin Barendse
 Marno Hart
 Rodville Bradley Jonkers
 Stallone Scott
 Anton Stander
 Etienne Swarts
To be confirmed

 Denzil Adams
 Donovan Andrew Adams
 Herman Adams
 Reduwan April
 Maxwell Bailey
 Adam George Barlow
 Llyle Ryan Bredenkamp
 Richard Thomas Daniels
 Joseph Dixon
 Nevin Edas
 Carlo Timm Erasmus
 Ernest Gavin Fredericks
 Pieter Stephanus Goosen
 Divan Gernic Green
 Birthrim Alviro Gysenberg
 Keegan Heinrich Kortje
 Brian Joseph Laserus
 Steven Lance Lategan
 Bronwin Lemonie
 Julrich Justin Liedeman
 Leighton Tesswin McQuire
 Christian Marlon Myburgh
 Dylan November
 Divan Bradley Roems
 Brandon Daniel Skippers
 Dillon Johannes Sono
 Ghriswin Swarts
 Christopher Leoroy Swartz
 Willem Petrus Jacobus Swiegers
 Francois Riaan Titus
 Devon George van Niekerk
 Christopher Peter Waldeck
 Wagheed Weideman
 Herchell Jowaan Wesso
 Warren Williams
Coach

 To be confirmed

Witbank Ferros

Forwards

 MC Botes
 Cole de Jager
 Izan Green
 Willem Kotze
 Theo Kruger
 Linda Masenya
 Willie Muller
 Sanza Ngwenya
 Dylan Pieterse
 Warren Shellnack
 Jackie Smit
 Werno Smit
 Hugo van der Merwe
 Willie van der Merwe
 Willem van Niekerk
 Edward Wallace
 Did not play:
 Joe Herrmann
 Jaco Marneweck
 Jean-Di Oosthuizen
 Brandon Snell
 Chris van Leeuwen
Backs

 Themba Bhengu
 Armand Botha
 Tommie Collen
 Kean Dry
 Christiaan Els
 Bennie Mashabane
 Gerhardus Munro
 Henson Ngozo
 Ruben Opperman
 Dewald Pieters
 Louis Roos
 Pule Sibiya
 Jannie van der Merwe
 Johan van der Walt
 Did not play:
 Jean Botha
 Wayne Dreyer
 Ruan du Plooy
 Mzwakhe Fransman
 Bernard Jansen van Vuuren
 Christo Nelson
 Jaun-dré Schmidt
To be confirmed

 Shane Agrella
 Siphesihle Barnabas
 Ruben Carelse
 Michael Chabant
 Jaco de Beer
 Devon Gibbons
 Dustin Edgar Hoffmann
 Neil Jansen van Rensburg
 Juan Kotze
 Thapelo Chris Maphome
 Petrus Prinsloo
 Nelius Snyman
 Christoffel Francois van der Merwe
Coach

 Willie Oosthuizen

Player statistics

The following table contain points which have been scored in the 2015 SARU Community Cup:

Referees

The following referees officiated matches in the 2015 SARU Community Cup:

 Rodney Boneparte
 Johre Botha
 Renie Coetzee
 Ruaan du Preez
 Stephan Geldenhuys
 AJ Jacobs
 Cwengile Jadezweni
 Jason Jaftha
 Jaco Kotze
 Pieter Maritz
 Ruhan Meiring
 Paul Mente
 Godwill Morebe
 Vusi Msibi
 Jacques Nieuwenhuis
 Sindile Ngcese
 Tahla Ntshakaza
 Francois Pretorius
 Jaco Pretorius
 Khotso Raleting
 Oregopotse Rametsi
 Egon Seconds
 Archie Sehlako
 Fernando Uithaler
 Divan Uys
 Ricus van der Hoven
 Lourens van der Merwe
 Renier Vermeulen

External links

References

2015
2015 in South African rugby union
2015 rugby union tournaments for clubs